Engin Oeztuerk also known as Engin Seyrl (born 1973 in Bremerhaven) is a Berlin based German–Turkish musician.

Biography 
Engin Oeztuerk works as a record producer, composer and Mastering- and Mixing-engineer for various projects. His first publications were in 1996. Engins variety of work can be heard in projects like  Faruk Green, Holmby Hills, Here Today or Desolé Leo. He also composes and produces music for film and advertising.

Projects 
Here Today, Faruk Green, Holmby Hills, Desolé Leo

Discography (Extract) 
 1996: Faruk Green – Untitled 7" (33rpm Records)
 1997: Faruk Green – Faith 7" (33rpm Records)
 1999: Faruk Green – On The Way To Üsküdar LP (Deck8)
 2002: Faruk Green – A Certain Mr. Green LP (Copasetik)
 2007: Here Today – Modernist 12" (Philpot)
 2008: Here Today – Good News (Buzzin' Fly)
 2010: Holmby Hills – Bohemia EP (FormResonance)
 2010: Here Today – Qualify & Satisfy (Suol)
 2011: Here Today – Down Here (Claqueur Records)

Labels (Extract) 
Suol, Buzzin' Fly. Philpot, Compost, FormResonance, Copasetik Rec.

References

External links 
 
 https://soundcloud.com/engino
 http://www.residentadvisor.net/dj/heretoday
 http://www.formresonance.com/artists/here-today
 https://www.facebook.com/HereT0day
 Here Today: Working – Video

German electronic musicians
Mastering engineers
1973 births
Living people